Shelley Lee Long (born August 23, 1949) is an American actress, singer, and comedian. Long portrayed Diane Chambers on the hit sitcom Cheers and received five Emmy nominations, winning in 1983 for Outstanding Lead Actress in a Comedy Series. She won two Golden Globe Awards for the role. Long reprised her role as Diane Chambers in three episodes of the spin-off Frasier, for which she received an additional guest star Emmy nomination. In 2009, she began playing a recurring role as DeDe Pritchett on the ABC comedy series Modern Family.

Long has also starred in several films including Night Shift (1982), Irreconcilable Differences (1984), The Money Pit (1986), Outrageous Fortune (1987), Hello Again (1987), Troop Beverly Hills (1989), The Brady Bunch Movie (1995), A Very Brady Sequel (1996), and Dr. T & the Women (2000).

Early life
Shelley Long was born on August 23, 1949, in Indian Village, Fort Wayne, Indiana. She is the daughter and only child of Ivadine (née Williams), a school teacher, and Leland Long who worked in the rubber industry before becoming a teacher. She grew up Presbyterian. She was active on her high school speech team, competing in the Indiana High School Forensic Association. In 1967, she won the National Forensic League's National Championship in Original Oratory.

After graduating from South Side High School in Fort Wayne, she studied drama at Northwestern University but left before graduating to pursue a career in acting and modeling. Her first job was at the university as a meal plan checker. She got her initial break as an actress when she began doing local commercials for Homemakers furniture store in the Chicago area.

Career

Early roles
In Chicago, Long joined The Second City comedy troupe. In 1975, she began writing, producing, and co-hosting the television program Sorting It Out on WMAQ-TV and went on to win three Regional Emmys for her work on the show. She also appeared in the 1970s in VO5 shampoo print advertisements and in commercials for Camay soap as well as more Homemakers furniture commercials. In 1978, she appeared in a vignette on The Love Boat.

In 1979, Long appeared in the television movie The Cracker Factory as a psychiatric inmate. In the same year she guest starred on Family and Trapper John, M.D. In 1980 she appeared in her first feature film role in A Small Circle of Friends. The film about social unrest at Harvard University during the 1960s enjoyed a level of critical success. In 1981, she played the role of Tala in Caveman. She played Nurse Mendenhall in a 1979 episode of M*A*S*H. In 1982, she starred as Belinda, the good-natured prostitute neighbor of the character portrayed by Henry Winkler in Ron Howard's comedy Night Shift (also co-starring Michael Keaton), and starred with Tom Cruise in Losin' It (1983). She was offered the role of Mary, the mother in Steven Spielberg's E.T. the Extra-Terrestrial, but turned it down because she had already signed on to appear in Night Shift.

Cheers
Although she had already been in feature films, Long became famous for her role in the long-running television sitcom Cheers as the character Diane Chambers, who has a tempestuous on-and-off relationship with Sam Malone. The show was slow to capture an audience but eventually became one of the more popular on the air. Amid some controversy, Long left Cheers after season five in 1987.

In the Cheers biography documentary, co-star Ted Danson admitted there was tension between them but "never at a personal level and always at a work level" due to their different modes of working. He also stated that Long was much more similar to her TV character than she might have liked to admit, but also said that her performances often "carried the show." Long said in later interviews that it did not occur to her, when deciding to leave, that she was going to "sabotage a show" and she felt confident that the rest of the cast could continue without her.

In a 2003 interview with Graham Norton, Long said she left for a variety of reasons, the most important of which was her desire to spend more time with her toddler daughter. In a 2007 interview on Australian television, Long said Danson was "a delight to work with" and talked of her love for co-star Nicholas Colasanto ("Coach"), who was "one of my closest friends on set". She said she left the show because she "didn't want to keep doing the same episode over and over again and the same story. I didn't want it to become old and stale." She went on to say that "working at Cheers was a dream come true...it was one of the most satisfying experiences of my life. So, yes, I missed it, but I never regretted that decision."

Film
While appearing on Cheers Long continued to star in motion pictures. In 1984, she was nominated for a Best Leading Actress Golden Globe for her performance in Irreconcilable Differences. She starred in a series of comedies, such as The Money Pit, Outrageous Fortune, and Hello Again. She was also offered lead roles in Working Girl, Jumpin' Jack Flash, and My Stepmother Is an Alien but did not accept those roles.

On August 12, 1986, Long signed a production agreement with The Walt Disney Studios through Itsbinso Long Inc. to produce three films for the Walt Disney Pictures and Touchstone Films labels.

Post-Cheers projects
Long's first post-Cheers project was Troop Beverly Hills, a comedy in which she plays a housewife who takes leadership of a 'Wilderness Girl' troop to bond with her daughter and to distract herself from divorce proceedings.

In 1990, Long returned to television for the fact-based miniseries Voices Within: The Lives of Truddi Chase. She received critical praise for the role, which required her to portray nearly 20 personalities. This introduced her to more dramatic roles in TV films, after which she starred in several more throughout the 1990s.

Major feature film roles followed such as the romantic comedy Don't Tell Her It's Me with Jami Gertz and Steve Guttenberg and Frozen Assets, a comedy about a sperm bank, which reunited her with Hello Again co-star Corbin Bernsen.

In 1992, she starred in Fatal Memories: The Eileen Franklin Story, a veridical television drama about a woman who remembers the childhood trauma of being raped by her father and his cronies, and witnessing him murder her childhood friend to prevent the child from "telling on him." The still-controversial "recovered memories" basis for the prosecution resulted in the conviction and sentencing of life imprisonment of George Franklin, a conviction that was later overturned.

Long starred in the 1992 film A Message from Holly with Lindsay Wagner. Long plays a workaholic who finds out that her best friend has cancer and only six months to live, then stays with her in her last months.

In 1993, the actress returned to Cheers for its series finale, and picked up another Emmy nomination for her return as Diane. She also starred in the sitcom Good Advice with Treat Williams and Teri Garr, a show that lasted two seasons. She later resurfaced as Diane in several episodes of the Kelsey Grammer spinoff series Frasier, for which she was nominated for another Emmy Award.

Later work
Long appeared as Carol Brady in the 1995 hit film The Brady Bunch Movie which is a campy take of the popular television show. In 1996, she reprised her role in A Very Brady Sequel which had modest success, and a 2002 Made for TV Movie sequel—The Brady Bunch in the White House. Some ventures followed including the TV remake of Freaky Friday and the family sitcom Kelly Kelly, which only lasted for a few episodes. She played the Wicked Witch of the Beanstalk in a 1998 episode of Sabrina, the Teenage Witch.

In 1999, she starred in another TV movie Vanished Without a Trace, about a woman who refuses to accept the kidnapping of her 13-year-old daughter and relentlessly pursues the villain's capture (not to be confused with the 1993 film of the same name about the 1976 Chowchilla kidnapping.) In 2000, she appeared as one of the women in the Richard Gere film Dr. T & the Women, directed by Robert Altman. She later returned for a third go-around playing Carol Brady in the TV movie The Brady Bunch in the White House.

Long guest-starred in several TV shows such as 8 Simple Rules, Yes Dear, Strong Medicine, and Boston Legal. She had a recurring role on the popular ABC sitcom Modern Family as DeDe Pritchett, the ex-wife of Jay Pritchett. She starred in television movies, including Falling in Love with the Girl Next Door and Holiday Engagement. In 2012, she made a guest appearance on Switched at Birth. In 2016, Long produced and acted in the feature film Different Flowers.

Personal life
Long's first marriage, to Ken Solomon, ended in divorce in the 1970s after only 
a few years. In 1979 she met her second husband, Bruce Tyson, a securities broker. They married in 1981 and had a daughter, Juliana. Long and Tyson separated in 2003 and divorced in 2004.

Filmography

Film

Television

Awards and nominations

Emmy Awards (Primetime)

Golden Globe Awards

References

External links

 
 
 
 

1949 births
20th-century American actresses
21st-century American actresses
20th-century American comedians
21st-century American comedians
Actors from Fort Wayne, Indiana
Actresses from Indiana
American film actresses
American sketch comedians
American stage actresses
American television actresses
American women comedians
Best Musical or Comedy Actress Golden Globe (television) winners
Best Supporting Actress Golden Globe (television) winners
Living people
Northwestern University School of Communication alumni
Outstanding Performance by a Lead Actress in a Comedy Series Primetime Emmy Award winners